Liza Alert is a nonprofit search-and-rescue volunteer organization to search for missing people. It is also known as the Liza Alert search-and-rescue team.

Liza Alert is more than a 24/7 response alert system. It not only carries out the functions of AMBER Alert in the former USSR, but also directs volunteer forces on active searches for all missing people.

Liza Alert origin 
Liza Alert takes its name from 5-year-old Liza Fomkina. In 2010 Liza died of hypothermia in the Russian wilderness after a 9 day unsuccessful search mission. The community was born less than 21 days after Liza's death.

The community isn't directly related to the law enforcement agencies of the Russian Federation. The main part of the search takes place in the former USSR region and surrounding areas. Priority is given to the search for children and the elderly, and people lost in the natural environment. The community does not provide paid search services; searches are free of charge and always executed by volunteers.

Liza Alert accomplishments 

Since 2010 Liza Alert has continually been taking part in searches for missing persons in Russia, famous or not. One of the most resonant events was the search of mathematician and University of London professor Alexey Chervonenkis.

Philip N. Howard, Director of the Center for Media, Data and Society in the School of Public Policy at Central European University, writes about Liza Alert as a form of civic project, which stands parallel with Russian Government. Media reviews, however, suggest, that it might not be true. as the performance of Liza Alert is high due to the interaction with the Ministry of Emergency Situations.

Liza Alert media and public support 

In 2013, State Duma deputy Olga Yepifanova had made a mistake, naming voluntary movement interfering and unorganized. In fact, the politician had confused Liza Alert with a completely different foundation.

References 

 Liza Alert volunteers demand an apology from Russian Federation Governor Epifanova
 Left in danger: Liza Alert team is taking part in another little girl search
 Search of missing helicopter Robinson R44
 Liza Alert Foundation is honored by "The Choice Award"
 University of London maths professor found dead in Moscow park; volunteer work was wildly used

External links 
 
 
 Liza Alert volunteer Handbook on Google Play
 Head of "Liza Alert" Grigory Sergeev - how to look for people who went missing in the city
 Time always work against you: saving children from maniacs
 Liza Alert official Facebook page
 Public statement from the chairman of Liza Alert
  Liza Alert in action
 Liza Alert in action
 Liza Alert in action

Non-profit organizations based in Russia
Child safety
Organizations established in 2010
Volunteer search and rescue organizations
2010 establishments in Russia